"Souvenirs" is a song written by Cy Coben and originally recorded by Barbara Evans in 1959.

Track listing 
7-inch single RCA Victor 47-7519 (US)
A. "Souvenirs" (2:00)
B. "Pray for Me Mother" (2:10)

Bill Ramsey version (in German) 
In the same year, the song was adapted into German. Sung by Bill Ramsey, it reached number one in West Germany.

Johnny Hallyday version (in French) 

French singer Johnny Hallyday released it (under the title "Souvenirs, souvenirs") as an EP in 1960.

Track listing 
7-inch EP Disques Vogue EPL 7755 (1960, France)
A1. "Souvenirs, souvenirs"
A2. "Pourquoi cet amour"
B1. "Je cherche une fille"
B2. "J'suis mordu"
  "J'suis mordu" is a French adaptation of "I Got Stung"

Charts

References

External links 
 Johnny Hallyday – "Souvenirs, souvenirs" (EP) at Discogs

1959 songs
1959 singles
1960 singles
Bill Ramsey (singer) songs
Johnny Hallyday songs
Disques Vogue singles
Songs written by Cy Coben